Boruto: Naruto Next Generations is a Japanese anime series based on the manga series of the same name and is a spin-off of and sequel to Masashi Kishimoto's Naruto. It is produced by Pierrot and broadcast on TV Tokyo. The anime is directed by Noriyuki Abe (#1–104), Hiroyuki Yamashita (#1–66), and Toshirō Fujii (#67–104) and is written by Makoto Uezu (#1–66) and Masaya Honda (#67–). Former manga writer Ukyō Kodachi supervised the story until episode 216.

Boruto follows the exploits of Naruto Uzumaki's son Boruto and his comrades from the Hidden Leaf Village's ninja academy while finding a path to follow once they grow up. Despite being based on the manga, the anime explores original storylines and the Naruto Shinden light novel series.

It premiered on TV Tokyo on April 5, 2017, and aired every Wednesday at 5:55 PM JST. Starting May 3, 2018 (episode 56) it aired every Thursday at 7:25 PM JST. Starting October 7, 2018 (episode 76) it now airs every Sunday at 5:30 PM JST. The series is also being released in DVDs. Viz Media licensed the series on March 23, 2017, to simulcast it on Hulu, and on Crunchyroll.

The opening theme songs are "It's All in the Game" by Qyoto (episodes 52–75), "Lonely Go!" by Brian the Sun (episodes 76–100), and "Golden Time" by Fujifabric (episodes 101–126). The ending theme songs are "Kachō Fūgetsu" by Coalamode (episodes 52–63), "Laika" by Bird Bear Hare and Fish (episodes 64–75), "Polaris" by Hitorie (episodes 76–87), "Tsuyogari Loser" by Real (episodes 88–100), "Ride or Die" by Skypeace (episodes 101–113).


Episode list

Home releases

Japanese

English

Notes

References

Naruto episodes
Naruto lists